Antoine Giacomasso (10 September 1904 – 19 July 1987) was a French racing cyclist. He rode in the 1927 Tour de France.

References

1904 births
1987 deaths
French male cyclists
Place of birth missing